Janet (Jan) Thomas is an Australian mathematician and educator. Together with Tony Guttman and Garth Gaudry she established the Australian Mathematical Sciences Institute (AMSI). She served as its executive officer until 2011. She is currently a senior fellow of AMSI.

Thomas was awarded a Medal of the Order of Australia in the 2013 Australia Day Honours for service to the mathematical sciences.

Thomas began her career lecturing in the  School of 
Education, Victoria University, Australia.  Throughout her career Thomas has held various leadership positions within the mathematical sciences in Australia.  She was the Executive Officer of the Australian Mathematical Society from 1996 to 2003.
She established the Australian Council of Heads of Mathematical Sciences, this group is now administered by AMSI.

From 1997 to 2001 Thomas was Vice-President of Federation  of  Australian  Scientific  and  Technological  Societies  (FASTS), (now Science & Technology Australia).  In 2000 Thomas authored the report Mathematical Science in Australia: Looking for a Future   published by the FASTS.  This report made a significant impact, and was quoted in parliamentary speeches.

References 

Living people
Year of birth missing (living people)
Australian women mathematicians
20th-century Australian mathematicians
21st-century Australian  mathematicians
20th-century women mathematicians
21st-century women mathematicians